William Paterson (judge) (1745–1806) was a U.S. Senator from New Jersey from 1789 to 1790. Senator Paterson may also refer to:

Basil A. Paterson (1926–2014), New York State Senate
David Paterson (born 1954), New York State Senate
John E. Paterson (1800–before 1885), New York State Senate
Lloyd H. Paterson (1925–1988), New York State Senate

See also
Senator Patterson (disambiguation)